The O'Farrell ministry was the 93rd ministry of the Government of New South Wales, and was led by Barry O'Farrell, the state's 43rd Premier.

The Liberal–National coalition ministry was formed following the defeat of the Keneally-led Labor government at the 2011 election. It was the first coalition ministry since the Greiner-Fahey-led coalition ministries of the late 1980s and early 1990s.

On 28 March 2011, O'Farrell and Nationals leader Andrew Stoner were sworn in by Governor Marie Bashir, as Premier and Deputy Premier respectively at a ceremony held in the office of the Chief Secretary of New South Wales. Although the Coalition's landslide victory was beyond doubt, counting was still underway in a few seats. With this in mind, O'Farrell had himself and Stoner sworn in as an interim two-man government until a full ministry could be sworn in. The balance of the ministry was sworn in on 3 April 2011 at Government House by the Lieutenant Governor, James Spigelman. 

On 16 April 2014, O'Farrell announced his intention to resign as Premier and as Leader of the Liberal Party, leading to the end of his government. The following day, Mike Baird was elected as Leader of the Liberal Party and he formed the Baird ministry which was sworn in on 23 April 2014.

Composition of ministry
The first re-arrangement occurred in August 2013, when Greg Pearce was dismissed from the ministry. The same month Graham Annesley resigned from the ministry and from parliament. The ministry was re-arranged when Chris Hartcher resigned from cabinet in December 2013. The ministry was dissolved on 23 April 2014 and succeeded by the Baird ministry.

 
Ministers are members of the Legislative Assembly unless otherwise noted.

See also

Members of the New South Wales Legislative Assembly, 2011–2015
Members of the New South Wales Legislative Council, 2011–2015

Notes

References

 

! colspan=3 style="border-top: 5px solid #cccccc" | New South Wales government ministries

New South Wales ministries
2011 establishments in Australia
Cabinets established in 2011
2014 disestablishments in Australia
Cabinets disestablished in 2014